The 4th Individual European Artistic Gymnastics Championships for both Men and Women was held in Berlin, Germany from 4 April 2011 until 10 April 2011. The event was held at the Max-Schmeling-Halle. 157 male gymnasts from 39 countries with and 86 female gymnasts from 32 countries participated.

Participation

Qualification

Participating nations
In order to participate, nations must be members of the European Union of Gymnastics.

Oldest and youngest competitors

Male

Female

Medal winners

Men's

Individual all-around

Oldest and youngest competitors

Finals

Floor 

Oldest and youngest competitors

Pommel horse 

Oldest and youngest competitors

Rings 

Oldest and youngest competitors

Vault 

Oldest and youngest competitors

Parallel bars 

Oldest and youngest competitors

Horizontal bar 

Oldest and youngest competitors

Women's

Individual all-around 

Oldest and youngest competitors

Aliya Mustafina tore her left ACL landing her Yurchenko 2.5 (the Amanar), and was forced to withdraw from the remainder of the competition.

Finals

Vault 

Oldest and youngest competitors

Uneven bars 

Oldest and youngest competitors

Balance beam 

Oldest and youngest competitors

Floor 

Oldest and youngest competitors

Medal count

Men

Women

Overall

References

External links
 Official Website

European Artistic Gymnastics Championships
European Artistic Gymnastics Championships
European Artistic Gymnastics Championships
European Artistic Gymnastics Championships
European Artistic Gymnastics Championships
2011 in European sport
2011 in Berlin